Eois ephyrata is a moth in the  family Geometridae. It is found on Borneo. The habitat consists of low elevation dipterocarp forests.

References

Moths described in 1863
Eois
Moths of Asia